Darlene Cook Fairley (born 1943) was a member of the Washington State Senate from 1995 to 2011 representing the 32nd District. In the Senate, she chaired the Government Operations and Elections Committee.

Fairly earned in B.S. in Political Science from the University of Washington in 1967.

Fairley became a Lake Forest Park councilmember in January 1992 and was first elected to the State Senate in 1994.  She succeeded Democrat Al Williams, who retired instead of moving when the 32nd district's boundaries were changed.

Fairley married Michael Gilbert Fairley in 1969. Fairley was disabled when her spine was crushed in a traffic accident involving a drunk driver in August 1977.

References

External links
Darlene Fairley's MySpace page

University of Washington College of Arts and Sciences alumni
Washington (state) city council members
Washington (state) state senators
Living people
1943 births
Women state legislators in Washington (state)
Women city councillors in Washington (state)
21st-century American women